Philip Lindsey Clark (1889–1977) was an English sculptor.

Background

Philip Lindsey Clark was born in London. His father was the sculptor Robert Lindsey Clark.

He worked with his father at the Cheltenham School of Art from 1905 to 1910 and then from 1910 to 1914 studied at the City and Guilds School in Kennington.  He had a most distinguished war record in the First World War, winning the DSO.  At the end of the war he won a scholarship to the Royal Academy Schools to continue his training and remained there from 1919 to 1924. From 1920 to 1952 he was a regular exhibitor at the Royal Academy Summer Exhibition and from 1921 onwards at the Paris Salon. From 1930 his work became more and more of a religious nature and he became a Carmelite Tertiary. He eventually retired from London and lived in the West Country.

Details of some of his works

Other work

Clark did other work in Sheffield apart from Sacred Heart church.  One was a limestone motif and coat of arms above the main entrance to The Royal Institute of the Blind building in Mappin Street, executed in 1938. The building has been demolished, but the Clark sculpture has been kept and it was when a new Institute of the Blind building was built in Judd Street. The work was of a blindfolded head and the right hand column was topped by a hand interpreting Braille in front of a symbol for light. The work also featured the Royal coat of arms. It seems that Clark also worked on reliefs for the Gas Showrooms on Commercial Street in Sheffield.

At the St Theresa Of The Child Jesus Church in Manor, Sheffield, Clark carved the stone statue of St Theresa above the main door of the church and the fourteen low relief stone Stations of the Cross inside. He also designed the internal boss in relief at the centre the dome, only visible from the sanctuary, depicting the Assumption of the Blessed Virgin Mary into Heaven. He carved the wooden statues of St Theresa kneeling, St Joseph the Carpenter, The Sacred Heart of Jesus and the Virgin Mary offering the swaddled Holy Child, for the four side chapels. The wooden carvings were painted by his son Michael Clark, who also carved and painted the larger than life size crucifix of Christ the King above the high altar. All colours used in the painting was pastel, light in nature, in harmony with the light planned to flood the church by its architect John Rochford.  P.L.Clark wrote in the souvenir brochure for the opening of the church, 3rd October, 1960 ( the then feast day of St .Theresa.)
"What can I do but explain something of what I have tried to say in stone, with the large Statue outside  of St. Theresa offering herself to God, and inside the Stations of the Cross. I would ask you particularly with the Stations to look at them not once, but until you get used to them. I have tried by the elimination of what I think to be non-essential details, to arrive at the greatest possible simplicity of treatment, thereby giving emphasis to what is expressed... You see also a contrast in the large Crucifix by my son Michael Clark, showing Our Lord as Christ The King, reigning from the cross. He has also painted for me my four wood figures. Our Lady offering to us the Holy Child, in swaddling clothes; a kneeling St Theresa, showing her love for Our Lord in the way she holds and looks at the crucifix; the Sacred Heart in all the humility of His burning love for humanity; then St. Joseph the Carpenter, guardian of the Holy Family."  This collaboration between father and son together with the large amount of Clark family original works in one building, twenty individual sculptures, make the church of St. Theresa of significant cultural importance to twentieth century devotional art and Catholic history.
 
By 2021, the crucifix by Michael Clark, is the only remaining wooden statue in the church, the other four original Clark Family artworks have been removed and replaced by off the shelf, conventional representations, changing the original dedications of the chapels. The Lady Chapel, to the South of the Sanctuary, that once housed Clarks unique and serene representation of the Virgin with the swaddled Christ Child suspended, hovering at her breast, is now the Sacred Heart Chapel, with a heavy, traditional representation of Christ, rather than Clark's spiritual, simple and slight statue of the same subject, that was once housed in the chapel at the rear of the church, to the north west. The loss of these original artworks, and the addition of coloured, painted walls, significantly diminishes the impact of the simplicity of the original interior of the church as planned by its designers, and of the visionary priest who commissioned it and all of the art it once housed, Fr Denis McGillicuddy.

Gallery

References

1889 births
1977 deaths
People educated at Cheltenham College
English sculptors
English male sculptors
Modern sculptors
British Army personnel of World War I
Royal Sussex Regiment officers
Companions of the Distinguished Service Order
Artists' Rifles soldiers
20th-century British sculptors
Catholic sculptors